Action Replay is a special six-song EP by British pop musician Howard Jones. It was released only in the United States and Canada to support the single version of Jones' hit "No One Is to Blame". Other songs on this release include tracks previously only available in the UK, and a handful of extended remixes. The EP was a substantial hit in North America and on import in Europe.

Action Replay was remastered and released on CD for the first time in 2011.

Track listing
Side A:

 "No One Is to Blame" (US single version) – 4:10
 "Look Mama" (Extended Mix) – 6:20
 "Hide and Seek" (Long Version) – 8:35

Side B:

 "Always Asking Questions" – 4:27
 "Bounce Right Back" (Cause & Effect Mix) – 7:25
 "Specialty" – 3:52

Charts

References

Howard Jones (English musician) albums
1986 debut EPs
1986 remix albums
Remix EPs
Albums produced by Rupert Hine
Elektra Records remix albums
Elektra Records EPs